Karliczek is a surname. Notable people with the surname include:

 Anja Karliczek (Anja Kerssen, born 1971), German politician 
Joachim Karliczek (1914–1993), Polish swimmer

See also

Milan Karlíček

Surnames from given names